The Lola T88/00 is an open-wheel racing car chassis, designed and built by Lola Cars that competed in the CART open-wheel racing series, for competition in the 1988 IndyCar season. It won a total of 4 races that season; 2 for Bobby Rahal, and 2 for Mario Andretti. It was powered by the Ilmor-Chevrolet 265-A turbo engine, but also used the Ford-Cosworth DFX, and the Judd AV.

References 

Open wheel racing cars
American Championship racing cars
Lola racing cars